A try pot is a large pot used to remove and render the oil from blubber obtained from cetaceans (whales and dolphins) and pinnipeds (seals), and also to extract oil from penguins. Once a suitable animal such as a whale had been caught and killed, the blubber was stripped from the carcass in a process known as flensing, cut into pieces, and melted in the try pots to extract the oil. 

Early on in the history of whaling, vessels had no means to process blubber at sea and had to bring it into port for processing. Later, though, whaling vessels frequently included a trywork, a brick furnace and set of try pots built into the deck. In the 18th- and 19th-century New England whaling industry, the use of the trywork allowed ships to stay at sea longer and boil out their oil. The slices of blubber were kept as thin as possible for the process, and on New England whaling ships, these slices were called "bible leaves" by the sailors.

The use of an onboard trywork was the major technological innovation that enabled the success of the Yankee whaling industry.

References 

 Melville, Herman, Moby-Dick, Chapter 96: "The Try-Works".

Further reading 
 "Trying Out the Oil", chapter in the book by Peter Cook, You Wouldn't Want to Sail on a 19th-Century Whaling Ship!, New York : Franklin Watts, 2004. 

Whaling implements